Penela is a town and a municipality in Portugal. It may also refer to the following places in Portugal:

 Penela Castle, a medieval castle
 Pai Penela, a civil parish in the Mêda Municipality
 Penela da Beira, a civil parish in the Penedono Municipality
 Póvoa de Penela, a civil parish in the Penedono Municipality

See also 
 Pinela, a civil parish in the municipality of Bragança